Abdul-Rahim Sārbān'  (1930 – April 2, 1993), known as Sarban, was an Afghan singer who was born in Kabul.

He was the first Afghan artist to break away from the prevalent musical forms in Afghanistan at the time, the Indian inspired pure classical tradition (epitomized by Ustad Sarahang, Rahim Bakhsh), and the 'Mohali' (regional & folk) musical traditions exemplified by the Dari music, logari, qataghani, qarsak.

Sarban's music fused elements, rhythms and orchestration of the western musical traditions of Jazz and "Belle Chanson" with the prevalent Afghan musical tradition to create a unique style which became an inspiration for ensuing artists.

Career 
Sarban gained popularity due to his music style, which was highly unconventional for its time, but it went on to become the gold standard of Afghan musical style. Sarban's popularity is mainly with the elite and educated classes in Afghanistan where appreciation of his music is considered the height of sophistication, learning, and elegance.

Sarban was born in an educated and accomplished family, but was the only male family members who had not gone to university.  Sarban's career in art began when the director and "father" of the Afghan National Theatre, Ustad Abdul Rashid Latifi overheard him humming a song in a hamaam. Ustad Latifi, however, did not conceive of Sarban as a singer since singing, at that time in Afghanistan, was a profession chosen very early in life and required years of work and training. Instead, Latifi asked Sarban to join his theatre as an actor, mainly due to his elegant & erudite elucidation and accent in Dari.

Sarban accepted the offer to work as an actor because, according to him, he had no prospects of employment and of feeding his young family.  While acting in the theatre, Sarban was rediscovered by the composers Nainawaz and Taranasaz for his extraordinary and evocative baritone voice. Without any training in voice or singing, Sarban was offered the opportunity to become a singer. His first recorded song was "Man Akher Az Ghamat Ay Mahro," and "Tu Aftabi Wo Man."  The songs, played on Kabul Radio, generated a great degree of interest and enthusiasm among the public.

Sarban had an acute ear for music and a broad and profound understanding of Persian poetry. Because of his lack of training and background in the predominant musical traditions in Afghanistan, Sarban became the artist who has freed Afghan music from subservience to the Indian, Iranian, and folkloric musical traditions.  In cooperation with various composers, Sarban managed to create a musical language that was unique to Afghanistan. Although his first few songs "Tu Aftabi wo man," and "Man akher az ghamat," were made strictly in the Indian classical model, his ensuing songs "Rahm kon ram kon," "Saqi dile ma," "ya maula dilam tang amada," "shod abro para para," and the hit songs, "Az bas ke nazanini," "Asare shikanje maujam," "Man nainawaz am," and "Harja ke safer karma," became models of a new sound that broke away from the traditional musical vocabulary in Afghanistan at the time.

This new sound was made immortal by the creation of a slew of songs in later years (such as Ahesta Bero, Ay Sarban, Dar Damane Sahra, Khorsheede Man, Ay Shakhe Gul, Moshke Taza Mebarad, Dosh Az Masjid, Deshab ba khoda, Nameporsi Naame man, Sobhe Keshaare Maiwar, Take nabashad ham dame jani, Ta ba kai ay mah liqa, Een ghame be haya mara, haal ke deewana shodam merawi, Aye shake gul) which defined Afghan music (especially the Persian musical genre) for decades to come.

Sarban sang in Dari as well as Pashto, possessing a comprehensive understanding of the Persian poetic tradition. Apart from his first few songs, Sarban chose the poems to his songs, based on his own personal knowledge of the Persian literary canon. During the early stages of his career, Sarban worked with many musicians and composers such as Nainawaz and Taranasaz. During the late stages of his career, he worked almost exclusively with the composer Salim Sarmast. Sarban's songs are ranked among the highest in the Afghan musical repertoire.

Sarban's legacy permanently altered the Persian (Dari) musical tradition in Afghanistan. A national icon and celebrity in Afghanistan, Sarban is also widely admired in other Persian-speaking countries like Iran and Tajikistan, where he gave live performances at the height of his career.

Sarban's artistic greatness was due to his eccentric and mysticist temperament, however it did not translate into financial prosperity. He was famed for refusing to do home (majlisi) shows for pay, and for giving the proceeds from his highly successful concerts to the beggars, without regard for his own or his family's financial well-being. Sarban stopped producing songs in the 1960s. During the 1970s, he was mainly involved in concerts & in re-recording his earlier music for audio cassettes (his original recordings at Radio Kabul at the time could not be converted to audio cassette form due to lack of high quality sound equipment in Afghanistan.)

Contributions 

Sarban's greatest contribution to Afghan music was the creation of a unique Afghan sound—distinct from the Indian, Iranian, regional (folkloric), western traditions.  His songs set an example for all pursuing Afghan artists to compose & perform in a style that was distinctly identifiable as Afghan, as opposed to mere imitation of other musical traditions.  His work with the legendary composer Salim Sarmast led to the creation of a rhythm, melody line, harmony, and texture which became the essence of the Dari (Persian) sound.  This sound was a major influence on many later musicians including Nainawaz, Ahmad Zahir, Ustad Zaland, Ahmad Wali, & later Farhad Darya.

Besides a unique and new musical sound, Sarban was the first artist to choose poems & lyrics for his songs which were not primarily about romantic love. The majority of songs in Afghanistan up to that point chose poems/lyrics about romance, love, longing, and the trials and tribulations related to love. Sarban considered this trend to be frivolous and glib.  He made a sharp departure from this tradition, and chose social, political, economic, spiritual, and even religious matters as subject for his songs.  An astute student of Dari/Persian literature, he personally picked poems which were considered to be not only unconventional but unsuitable for being turned into songs. For instance, Een Ghame Be Haya, Ay Sarban, and Dar Damane Sahra, Ay Shakhe Gul, Harja Ke Safar Kardam, Beya Ta Gal Beyafshanem, were considered too erudite, abstract, and gloomy to be composed into songs. Almost all composers declined to consider them for composition. If he did not get his way and was pressured by his employer (Kabul Radio) to sing more conventional love songs, he picked a completely unrelated verse or two from another poem & inserted it in the romantic song composed for him.  For example, in his song "Soraya chara Am kon," which contains a traditional romantic subject, he violently inserted a completely unrelated verse.

Sarban was the first person to put lyrics to the iconic "Ahesta Boro" (Step slowly) anthem played for all brides on their wedding day. These lyrics, along with the composition, have become an expected and celebrated feature of Afghan weddings, with the composition also having been sung by many popular Afghan artists. Muslim singer Sami Yusuf used the tune of a Sarban composition, "Beyake Berem Ba Mazar" (Come, Lets Go to Mazaar), in his song "Hasbi Rasbi". Many others have covered the song and composition within Afghanistan and in other Persian cultures.

Sarban's "Moshke Taza Mebarad" became one of the models for patriotic and national songs, and is still one of the most evocative and emotionally stirring Patriotic songs of Afghanistan due to its original and moving composition and evocative singing. It is said that many composers laughed at Sarban when he suggested the poem for composition into a national song due to the poem's complex vocabulary and imagery, but his collaborator Salim Sarmast set the lyrics to a sublime composition which moves Afghans until now.

In addition to the compositions and lyrics he contributed, Sarban was also arguably symbolic and typical of Afghanistan's culture in his day, reflected in his singing of the beautiful poetry of many famous poets from ages past, such as Hafiz Shirazi, to whom he paid tribute with the song "Dozh as Masjid (Soye Maykhanaa Aamad Peer e Ma)" (Last night, upon departing the Mosque, our Master headed towards the Tavern). Sarban's cover is a cut down version of the original poem, retaining 3 of the 10 verses composed by Shirazi.

Sarban's compositions, like "Dozh as Masjid", feature various styles of Sufi or mystical poetry, which use the metaphorical language of romantic love, to describe the author's relationship with God. Often such poems use words such as "beloved" figuratively regarding God, and it could be argued that Sarban was part of a musical movement in Afghanistan which sought to enlighten the audience as much as it entertained them. In his own personal life, Sarban was highly influenced by the Sufi tradition of mysticism. This is evident not only in his choice of poetry, but also in his mannerisms, such as his constant raising of his forefinger when speaking or singing.

Sarban's songs "Ay Sarban" (based on a poem by Saadi), Dar Damane Sahra are considered among the most accomplished examples of the Afghan musical repertoire.

Almost all of Sarban's songs were recorded in the first decade of his career—1960s. The vast majority of his original repertoire, which was recorded with a full orchestra, is not available. Except for a few songs from the original recordings (Khorsheede Man, Asare Shikanje Maujam, Az Bas Ke Nazanini), the majority of Sarban's songs are re-recordings which were done in the late 1970s and released in audio cassettes.  These later versions lack the full orchestra and chorus and rely on only a few instruments. Sarban's vocal gifts were past their prime at that point. Most originals recordings which were held at Kabul Radio, were destroyed by the Taliban in the late 1990s. Recently a few vintage and rare recordings of Sarban's records (for instance the original of his song Khorsheede Man, and Asare Shikanje Moujam) were uploaded on YouTube.

Sarban's songs have been covered both live and in recording by a vast number of Persian singers.  In Afghanistan, his song "Ahesta Bero" is played in every Persian wedding as the bride walks to the aisle, in the same manner as Wagner's Bridal Chorus is played each time a bride in the west walks the aisle.  His song such as Ay Sarban is covered by hugely popular singers such as Googoosh (from Iran) and Ahmad Zahir from Afghanistan. Every successful musician cite him as one of their main influences.

Personal life 
Sarban was born in Saragy, an old area of Kabul to the prominent and highly respected Mahmoody family.  His father was a well-educated, highly respected, and prosperous rice merchant.  The Mahmoody's were a family of illustrious doctors and surgeons highly respected among the educated elite of Kabul.  However, The Mahmoody family had been leading social agitation and political activism for decades.  As a result, his family was continuously persecuted by the monarchy at first, and then by successive governments which came after the monarchy. This persecution resulted in a huge diminishment of the family's wealth to the point that by the time Sarban was in his teens, they were virtually penniless. The majority of the most prominent and successful family members (including Sarban's only two brothers, and almost all of his first cousins) had been either executed or exiled by the time Sarban had begun his musical career. These conditions profoundly influenced his choice of poetry and his music.  For example, he chose the poem "Een Ghame Be Haya," for composition when his first cousin Latif Mahmoody had been arrested and executed.

Sarban was shy and reclusive throughout his life. He seemed indifferent to fame, celebrity, and wealth for his entire life, even when through the prime of his career, which began peaking in the 1960s. At the peak of his celebrity, he polarized the Afghan intellectual class between those who loved and referred him for his art and those who criticized him for his personal life.  Speculations said he had a constant problem with alcohol with claims he couldn't sing live on Kabul Radio without having a drink first.

Sarban did fight with severe bouts of depression throughout his life. Many of his close relatives (including his younger brother) were arrested for their political activities and executed by the regime at the time, and many others were imprisoned or forced to flee in exile. This and the difficulties of raising a family without any reliable source of income were the main reasons for his depressive bouts. His close friends and family all dismiss this as urban legend.  Sarban was indeed married to one of his cousins, and he has four children (three daughters and a son). His son Abdulrab Sarban recorded an album covering some of Sarban's famous songs.

In 1984, Sarban suffered a stroke which left him paralysed and unable to speak. This ended his musical career. During political turmoil in Afghanistan in the 1990s, he and his family emigrated to Pakistan and became impoverished. He died in Pakistan and twelve years after his death, the Afghan Government made arrangements with his family to relocate his remains to Kabul.

References 

20th-century Afghan male singers
1930 births
1993 deaths
People from Kabul
Afghan Tajik people
Afghan male singers
Persian-language singers
20th-century male singers
Afghan emigrants to Pakistan
Afghan expatriates in Pakistan
Afghan expatriate musicians in Pakistan